Carlos Diaz may refer to:

Sportspeople
Carlos Díaz (athlete) (born 1993), Chilean middle-distance runner
Carlos Diaz (catcher) (born 1964), played for Toronto Blue Jays
Carlos Diaz (pitcher) (1958–2015), pitcher in Major League Baseball
Carlos Díaz (footballer, born 1974), Argentine footballer
Carlos Díaz (footballer, born 1979), Uruguayan international footballer
Carlos Díaz (footballer, born 1982), Colombian football defender
Carlos Diaz (soccer, born 1987), American professional football (soccer) player

Others
Carlos Diaz (Emmerdale), fictional character in British TV soap opera Emmerdale
Carlos Díaz (politician) (born 1970), member of the Senate of Puerto Rico
Carlos Diaz (theater director) (born 1957), Cuban theater director
Carlos Díaz "Caíto" (1945–2004), Argentine singer-songwriter and guitarist
Carlos Enrique Díaz de León (1910–1971), provisional President of Guatemala, 1954
Carlos Gaviria Díaz (born 1937), Colombian lawyer, professor and politician
Carlos Jiménez Díaz (1898–1967), Spanish physician and clinical researcher
Carlos Patricio Díaz (born 1970), Chilean-born Canadian film and television actor

See also
 Carlos Dias (disambiguation)